The muscular salamander (Pseudoeurycea papenfussi) is a species of salamander in the family Plethodontidae.
It is endemic to Mexico.

Its natural habitats are subtropical or tropical dry forests and rocky areas.
It is threatened by habitat loss.

References

Amphibians of Mexico
Pseudoeurycea
Taxonomy articles created by Polbot
Amphibians described in 2005